In human anatomy, the thigh is the area of the lower extremity between the knee and the pelvis.

Thigh may also refer to:
Thigh (poultry), a cut of poultry
Thigh bone, also known as the femur
Thigh kick, a move in Muay Thai
Thigh strap (disambiguation), various meanings
Thigh lock, a type of compression lock
Thigh-high boots, a type of boots